"Devil in His Heart" is a song written by Richard B. Drapkin, who recorded under the name Ricky Dee.

Recordings
The song was originally recorded as "Devil in His Heart" in Detroit by the Donays for Correc-tone Records. It was later picked up by the New York City label Brent and re-released in August 1962 as "(There's a) Devil in His Heart", the B-side of "Bad Boy". This pairing also appeared in the United Kingdom on the Oriole label in 1962. The record was not a hit on either side of the Atlantic. The Donays only made one recording but their lead singer, Yvonne Vernee (real name Yvonne Symington) also recorded solo, and later joined the Elgins at Motown.

The Beatles' version

As "Devil in Her Heart", the song was performed by English rock band the Beatles with George Harrison on lead vocals. It was issued on their second UK album, With the Beatles, in November 1963. The recording was completed in three takes, plus overdubs.

Personnel
George Harrison – double-tracked vocal, lead guitar
John Lennon – backing vocal, rhythm guitar
Paul McCartney – backing vocal, bass
Ringo Starr – drums, maracas
George Martin – producer
Norman Smith – engineer

Personnel per Ian MacDonald

A BBC recording of the song was issued in 1995 as a B-side to "Baby It's You".

When Mojo released a reworking of With the Beatles in 2013, the track was covered by Trevor Moss and Hannah-Lou of bluegrass band Indigo Moss.

Notes

References

Devil In Her Heart
Devil In Her Heart
1962 songs
1962 singles